Kouroukoto or Kroukoto  is a village and rural commune in the Cercle of Kéniéba in the Kayes Region of south-western Mali. The commune includes 9 villages and at the time of 2009 census had a population of 7,980.

References

External links
.

Communes of Kayes Region